The Secretary of Foreign Affairs is the foreign secretary of Mexico, responsible for implementing the country's foreign policy. The secretary is appointed by the President of Mexico to head the Secretariat of Foreign Affairs and is a member of the federal executive cabinet. The Secretary is commonly referred to as Canciller (Spanish for Chancellor) in Mexico.

The  Secretary of Foreign Affairs is Marcelo Ebrard.

List of Secretaries of Exterior Relations
Ignacio Mariscal 1880–1883, 1885–1910
Enrique Creel 1910–1911
Francisco León de la Barra 1911, 1913
Victoriano Salado Álvarez 1911
Bartolomé Carvajal y Rosas 1911
Manuel Calero y Sierra 1911–1912
Pedro Lascuráin Paredes  1912–1913
Federico Gamboa Iglesias 1913
Francisco Escudero 1913
Querido Moheno Tabares 1913–1914
José López Portillo y Rojas 1914
Francisco S. Carvajal 1914
Ignacio Borrego 1915
Cándido Aguilar 1916, 1916–1917, 1918
Miguel Covarrubias Acosta 1920
Cutberto Hidalgo Téllez 1920–1921
Alberto J. Pani Arteaga 1921-1924
Aarón Sáenz Garza 1924–1927
Genaro Estrada 1930–1932
Manuel C. Téllez 1932 (interim)
José Manuel Puig Casauranc 1933–1934
Emilio Portes Gil 1934–1935
Eduardo Hay 1935–1940
Ezequiel Padilla Peñaloza 1940–1945
Francisco Castillo Nájera 1945–1946
Jaime Torres Bodet 1946–1951
Manuel Tello Baurraud 1951–1952
Luis Padilla Nervo 1952–1958
Manuel Tello Baurraud 1958–1964
José Gorostiza 1964 (interim)
Antonio Carrillo Flores 1964–1970
Emilio Óscar Rabasa 1970–1975
Alfonso García Robles 1975–1976
Santiago Roel García 1976–1979
Jorge Castañeda y Álvarez 1979–1982
Bernardo Sepúlveda Amor 1982–1988
Fernando Solana Morales 1988–1993 
Manuel Camacho Solís 1993–1994 
Manuel Tello Macías 1994 (interim)
José Ángel Gurría 1994–1998
María del Rosario Green Macías 1998–2000
Jorge Germán Castañeda Gutman 2000–2003
Luis Ernesto Derbez 2003–2006
Patricia Espinosa Cantellano 2006–2012
José Antonio Meade Kuribreña 2012–2015
Claudia Ruiz Massieu 2015–2017
Luis Videgaray Caso 2017-2018
Marcelo Ebrard 2018-present

List of doctrines
 Estrada Doctrine
 Castañeda Doctrine

References

External links

 Secretariat of Exterior Relations website